Khairul Firdaus bin Akbar Khan is a Malaysian politician who has served as the Deputy Minister of Tourism, Arts and Culture in the Pakatan Harapan (PH) administration under Prime Minister Anwar Ibrahim and Minister Tiong King Sing since December 2022 and the Member of Parliament (MP) for Batu Sapi since November 2022. He is a direct member of the Gabungan Rakyat Sabah (GRS) coalition.

Election results

References 

Living people
People from Sabah
Malaysian Muslims
Members of the Dewan Rakyat
21st-century Malaysian politicians
Year of birth missing (living people)